Boeadi’s roundleaf bat (Hipposideros boeadii) is a species of roundleaf bat found in Indonesia.

Taxonomy and etymology
Boeadi's roundleaf bat was described as a new species in 2007. The holotype, an adult female, was collected in August 2000 on Sulawesi. The eponym for the species name "boeadii" is Indonesian zoologist Boeadi, "in recognition of his long-standing  contribution to bat research in Indonesia."

Description
Its fur is reddish-brown over its whole body. Its ears, nose-leaf, and flight membranes are all dark brown or blackish.

Range and habitat
The type locality of this species is Rawa Aopa Watumohai National Park in Indonesia. All individuals of the type series were documented in lowland rainforest,  from savanna habitat.

Conservation
As of 2016, Boeadi’s roundleaf bat is listed as a data deficient species by the IUCN. Any threats that this species faces are unknown.

References

Bats of Indonesia
Mammals described in 2007
Hipposideros